Stacy King is a former character actress of the 1960s. Red-haired and tall, King had guest-starring roles in Alfred Hitchcock Presents, Gomer Pyle, U.S.M.C. and The Beverly Hillbillies on television, and featured roles in movies The Sweet Ride and Skidoo. She was born and raised in Memphis, Tennessee.

King raised white German shepherd dogs, at one point she was the vice-president of her local branch of the White German Shepherd Club of America.

References

External links

American film actresses
American television actresses
Possibly living people
20th-century American actresses
Year of birth missing